During the 1972–73 English football season, Brentford competed in the Football League Third Division. The early-season departures of goalscorers John O'Mara and Bobby Ross and 15 consecutive away league defeats led to Brentford's relegation straight back to the Fourth Division.

Season summary 

Brentford's promotion to the Third Division at the end of the 1971–72 season meant that the club would compete in the third-tier for the first time since 1965–66. Self-imposed financial austerity since the club's relegation to the Fourth Division had enabled the club's large debts to be paid off, but despite promotion and increasing attendances, manager Frank Blunstone would again be forced to maintain a small playing squad. Blunstone turned down the chance to become assistant manager at Everton during the off-season. Released in the wake of the promotion were defender Steven Tom, midfielder Brian Turner and winger Gordon Neilson and in came amateur goalkeeper Paul Priddy, midfielders David Court and Alan Murray, winger David Jenkins and Stewart Houston's loan was turned into a permanent transfer for a £15,000 fee. The Brentford youth team was also reactivated after being disbanded due to the budget cuts of 1967, with Kevin Harding, Richard Poole and Graham Pearce being taken on as apprentices. Gary Huxley would win an England Youth cap during the season.

Despite losing and drawing the first two league matches of the season, three consecutive wins put Brentford in 2nd position by 2 September 1972. 10 days later, forward John O'Mara, the previous season's Gallagher's Divisional Footballer Of The Year, was sold to Third Division rivals Blackburn Rovers for a club-record £50,000 fee. Given that Chelsea had recently paid Southend United £100,000 for 25-goal forward Bill Garner, it was felt amongst the Brentford supporters that O'Mara had been sold cheaply. The loss of O'Mara's goals and the departure of captain Bobby Ross shortly afterwards contributed a great deal to Brentford's relegation at the end of the season, given that the two players had scored over half of Brentford's goals during the previous campaign.

By early October 1972, Brentford were in the bottom-six of the Third Division, but a profit of nearly £80,000 from the first eight league matches of the season and the £50,000 from the sale of John O'Mara allowed manager Frank Blunstone to pay £10,000 for Carlisle United forward Stan Webb. By mid-December, Blunstone had just 12 fit players available and despite spending over a further £25,000 on attackers Roger Cross, Barry Salvage and Andy Woon, Brentford's slide towards relegation continued through the early months of 1973. The mid-season signings failed to help arrest the slump and Brentford were relegated after taking just two points from the final six matches of the season. Aside from the lack of goals (winger John Docherty top-scored with 8), Brentford lost 15 consecutive away league matches during the season, a new club record.

League table

Results
Brentford's goal tally listed first.

Legend

Pre-season and friendlies

Football League Third Division

FA Cup

Football League Cup 

 Sources: 100 Years of Brentford, The Big Brentford Book of the Seventies,Croxford, Lane & Waterman, p. 301-302. Statto

Playing squad 
Players' ages are as of the opening day of the 1972–73 season.

 Sources: The Big Brentford Book of the Seventies, Timeless Bees

Coaching staff

Statistics

Appearances and goals
Substitute appearances in brackets.

Players listed in italics left the club mid-season.
Source: 100 Years of Brentford

Goalscorers 

Players listed in italics left the club mid-season.
Source: 100 Years of Brentford

Management

Summary

Transfers & loans

Awards 
 Supporters' Player of the Year: Peter Gelson
 Players' Player of the Year: Paul Bence

References 

Brentford F.C. seasons
Brentford